Hezbollah involvement in the Syrian Civil War has been substantial since the beginning of armed insurgency phase of the Syrian Civil War in 2011, and evolved into active support for Ba'athist government forces and troop deployment from 2012 onwards. By 2014, Hezbollah was deployed across Syria. Hezbollah has also been very active in preventing Al-Nusra Front and Islamic State penetration into Lebanon, being one of the most active forces in the Syrian Civil War spillover in Lebanon.

In the past, Hezbollah has served a strategic arm of Iran in the region, playing a key role in the Iran–Israel and Iran–Saudi Arabia proxy conflicts. On a number of occasions, Hezbollah weapon convoys in Syria and Syrian-Lebanese border areas were attacked, presumably by the Israeli military. Hezbollah convoys have also been attacked by Syrian rebel factions, most notably the Al-Nusra Front.

Timeline of Hezbollah deployment in Syria

2011–2012
Hezbollah has long been an ally of the Ba'ath government of Syria, led by the Al-Assad family. Hezbollah has helped the Syrian Ba'ath government during the Syrian civil war in its fight against the Syrian opposition, which Hezbollah has described as a "plot to destroy its alliance with al-Assad against Israel". Geneive Abdo opined that Hezbollah's support for al-Assad in the Syrian war has "transformed" it from a group with "support among the Sunni for defeating Israel in a battle in 2006" into a "strictly Shia paramilitary force".

In August 2012, the United States sanctioned Hezbollah for its alleged role in the war. General Secretary Hassan Nasrallah denied Hezbollah had been fighting on behalf of the Syrian Ba'ath government, stating on 12 October 2012 that "right from the start the Syrian opposition has been telling the media that Hizbullah sent 3,000 fighters to Syria, which we have denied". However, according to the Lebanese Daily Star newspaper, Nasrallah said in the same speech that Hezbollah fighters helped the Ba'athist government "retain control of some 23 strategically located villages [in Syria] inhabited by Shiites of Lebanese citizenship". Nasrallah said that Hezbollah fighters died in Syria doing their "jihadist duties".

In 2012, Hezbollah fighters crossed the border from Lebanon and took over eight villages in the Al-Qusayr District of Syria. On 16–17 February 2013, Syrian opposition groups claimed that Hezbollah, backed by the Syrian military, attacked three neighboring Sunni villages controlled by the Free Syrian Army (FSA). An FSA spokesman said, "Hezbollah's invasion is the first of its kind in terms of organisation, planning and coordination with the Syrian regime's air force". Hezbollah said three Lebanese Shiites, "acting in self-defense", were killed in the clashes with the FSA. Lebanese security sources said that the three were Hezbollah members. In response, the FSA allegedly attacked two Hezbollah positions on 21 February; one in Syria and one in Lebanon. Five days later, it said it destroyed a convoy carrying Hezbollah fighters and Syrian officers to Lebanon, killing all the passengers.

The leaders of the March 14 alliance and other prominent Lebanese figures called on Hezbollah to end its involvement in Syria and said it is putting Lebanon at risk. Subhi al-Tufayli, Hezbollah's former leader, said "Hezbollah should not be defending the criminal regime that kills its own people and that has never fired a shot in defense of the Palestinians". He said "those Hezbollah fighters who are killing children and terrorizing people and destroying houses in Syria will go to hell". The Consultative Gathering, a group of Shia and Sunni leaders in Baalbek-Hermel, also called on Hezbollah not to "interfere" in Syria. They said, "Opening a front against the Syrian people and dragging Lebanon to war with the Syrian people is very dangerous and will have a negative impact on the relations between the two". Walid Jumblatt, leader of the Progressive Socialist Party, also called on Hezbollah to end its involvement and claimed that "Hezbollah is fighting inside Syria with orders from Iran". Egyptian President Mohamed Morsi condemned Hezbollah by saying, "We stand against Hezbollah in its aggression against the Syrian people. There is no space or place for Hezbollah in Syria".
According to the Jewish Journal of Greater Los Angeles, support for Hezbollah among the Syrian public has weakened since the involvement of Hezbollah and Iran in propping up the Assad regime during the civil war.

According to the U.S., the Assad loyalist militia known as al-Jaysh al-Sha'bi was created and is maintained by Hezbollah and Iran's Islamic Revolutionary Guard Corps-Qods Force, both of whom provide it with money, weapons, training and advice.

2013
On 4 April 2013, Hezbollah with the Syrian army launched an offensive to retake part of Qusayr. Syrian Army forces with the help of Hezbollah and the National Defense Forces captured Qusayr extinguishing final rebel resistance after two months of fighting.

On 25 May 2013, Nasrallah announced that Hezbollah is fighting in the Syrian Civil War against Islamic extremists and "pledged that his group will not allow Syrian militants to control areas that border Lebanon". He confirmed that Hezbollah was fighting in the strategic Syrian town of Al-Qusayr on the same side as Assad's forces. In the televised address, he said, "If Syria falls in the hands of America, Israel and the takfiris, the people of our region will go into a dark period."

On 26 May 2013, two rockets hit a Hezbollah area of Beirut injuring five people whilst another two rockets caused property damage to buildings in the al-Hermel district of Beirut. Syrian rebels have been blamed for the attack as they had promised to attack Hezbollah targets in Lebanon in retaliation for their helping the Syrian army particularly in the border town of Al-Qusayr. Syrian rebels have also shelled al-Hermel previously.

On 28 May 2013, Free Syrian Army General Salim Idris gave Hezbollah "24 hours to withdraw from Syria" or he may order FSA units to attack Hezbollah targets in Lebanon.

In early June 2013, Hezbollah committed some 2,000 fighters to the battle in Aleppo, reportedly putting strain on the organisation. Hezbollah changed the rotation policy for its fighters from 7 days fighting followed by 7 days leave, to 20 days fighting followed by 7 days leave.

2014
In 2014, Hezbollah's involvement was steady and staunch in support of the Ba'athist government forces across Syria.

2015
In January 2015, Free Syrian Army groups and al-Qaeda's al-Nusra Front launched an offensive against Hezbollah strongholds in the Jayrud area in the western Qalamoun Mountains, near the Lebanese border. Media sources affiliated with the Syrian opposition report that the joint forces targeted a series of military checkpoints held by Hezbollah in the area surrounding the village of Flaita in Kalamoon. Heavy losses were reported in the ranks of the pro-Assad security forces and militants of Hezbollah, as the FSA rebels seized a number of heavy and light weapons as well as boxes of ammunition during the operation. At least three FSA fighters were killed. A military official of al-Nusra reported that the ISIS presence in the area has exceeded 700 men, amid fears of escalating violence between both groups.

Israelí media claimed that given that Hezbollah's military involvement faced battles are with Muslims, Hezbollah had emphasized its readiness to wage war against Israel.

In May 2015, Hezbollah forces launches a new offensive in the Qalamoun region in Rif DImashq Governorate, supported by the Syrian Army with the aim of clearing al-Nusra Front and other Syrian opposition forces entrenched in the mountains of the Qalamoun region.

2016
Hezbollah began its participation in the Siege of Deir ez-Zor in 2016.

In May, Hezbollah's top military commander in Syria, Mustafa Badreddine, was killed in murky circumstances near the Damascus International Airport.

2017
Hezbollah participated in the East Aleppo offensive (January–April 2017) and in the Battle of al-Bab against ISIL in February 2017.

Hezbollah played a significant role in the Daraa offensive (February–June 2017), with several casualties. In April, rebels reported that an SAA lieutenant Colonel was executed by the Lebanese Hezbollah militia over charges of ‘treason’ in al-Manshiya.

In the March 2017 Israel–Syria incident, Israel took responsibility for an airstrike in Syria on a military site near Palmyra that they said was targeting Hezbollah. The Syrian Arab Army reportedly launched S-200 missiles at the Israeli jets, and Israel intercepted one S-200 missile with an Arrow 2 missile.

The April 2017 Rif Dimashq airstrike was an aerial attack on an arms depot belonging to the Lebanese Shi'a militia Hezbollah. On 27 April 2017, Syria's state-run SANA news agency said that there was an explosion felt in Damascus International Airport at 3:42 am. No casualties were reported. Israeli media said residents in the northern town of Safed reported seeing two missiles being launched and explosions occurring afterwards. Witnesses said a total of five strikes occurred near the airport road. The missiles were so powerful that the impact was felt several kilometres away in the Damascus countryside. According to Al-Manar Television, the Israel Air Force reportedly attacked an Iranian arms depot near the Damascus International Airport early Thursday morning. Various sources have mentioned that the attack was executed around 03:20 EEST. The spokesman for the Israel Defense Forces declined to comment on the airstrike. The Israeli Intelligence Minister Yisrael Katz hinted on possible responsibility for the explosion, telling Army Radio that "The incident in Syria corresponds completely with Israel's policy to act to prevent Iran's smuggling of advanced weapons via Syria to Hezbollah. Two rebel sources told Reuters that "five strikes hit an ammunition depot used by Iran-backed militias." Iranian Defense Minister Hossein Dehghan told Rossiya-24 news channel that Israel "should be disarmed" for the sake of restoring peace and security in the region and that it had [pursued] nothing but war and bloodshed. Kremlin spokesman Dmitry Peskov called for all countries to refrain any kind of actions and respect of Syrian sovereignty in a press conference. Russian Foreign Ministry spokeswoman Maria Zakharova later slammed the strikes by condemning it as an act of aggression against Syria.

On 1 June 2017, it was reported on social media that 3 Hezbollah members, including a Lebanese Hezbollah Field Commander Abdel Hamid Mahmoud Shri (nicknamed Abu Mahdi), had been killed by FSA and ISIS in battles for control of the desert between Syria and Iraq. The same month, Hezbollah participated in the Daraa offensive (June 2017).

On 21 July 2017, Hezbollah and the Syrian army launched an offensive against Tahrir al-Sham (HTS) in the area of Juroud Arsal, on the outskirts of the Lebanese town of Arsal, aiming to drive HTS fighters from their last foothold along the Syria-Lebanon border. The offensive was undertaken on two fronts: near Arsal and the Syrian town of Fleita, into a mountainous area where Islamist militants had taken shelter among camps for Syrian refugees.

In the summer and autumn of 2017, Hezbollah played a major role in the pro-government Central Syria campaign (2017). In October, its al-Radhwan forces commander Ali al-Aa'shiq was reported to have been killed by ISIL, along with other Hezbollah fighters, in this campaign.

In September 2017, a Hezbollah commander said the group has 10,000 fighters in southern Syria ready to confront Israel.

In November 2017, Hezbollah spearheaded the pro-government capture of Abu Kamal from ISIL.

In November–December 2017, Hezbollah played a leading role in the Beit Jinn offensive against rebel forces close to the Golan.

2018
In June 2018, Israeli and Syrian opposition media reported that a senior Hezbollah field officer executed 23 Syrian soldiers from the 9th Armoured Division after they refused to cross a bridge which was exposed to rebel fire, and was nicknamed the "Death Bridge", near the town of Hirbat Ghazala, north of the city of Daraa.

2019

In early July, Hezbollah began to withdraw from Damascus suburbs and south Syria back to Lebanon.

Analysis
National interest and other Western analysis noted the role of Hezbollah in turning the tides of the Syrian Civil War in favour of the government. After the organization's role in Qusayr, Homs and Aleppo, the armed wing of the Lebanese Party gained political and military experience fighting in urban environments, and enlarged its alliance with Syria and Iran.

Hezbollah's role has been critical in defeating Syrian rebels on behalf of the Syrian government and has grown stronger in the region.

Incidents involving Hezbollah fighters in Syria

See also
 Iranian involvement in the Syrian Civil War
 Syrian Civil War spillover in Lebanon

References
 

Hezbollah involvement in the Syrian civil war
Foreign involvement in the Syrian civil war
Iranian involvement in the Syrian civil war
2011 in the Syrian civil war
2012 in the Syrian civil war
2013 in the Syrian civil war
2014 in the Syrian civil war
2015 in the Syrian civil war
2016 in the Syrian civil war
2017 in the Syrian civil war
2018 in the Syrian civil war
2019 in the Syrian civil war
2020 in the Syrian civil war
2021 in the Syrian civil war
Politics of Syria
Politics of Lebanon
Lebanon–Syria relations
Lebanon–Syria border
Lebanese involvement in the Syrian civil war
Hezbollah
Wars involving Hezbollah
Arab Winter in Lebanon
Iran–Israel proxy conflict
Iran–Israel conflict during the Syrian civil war
Hezbollah–Israel conflict
Iran–Saudi Arabia relations
Iran–Saudi Arabia military relations
Iran–Saudi Arabia proxy conflict